Kyung Wha Chung (born 26 March 1948) is a South Korean violinist.

Early years and education
Kyung Wha Chung was born in Seoul as the middle of the seven children in her family. Her father was an exporter, and her mother ran a restaurant. 
She began piano studies at age 4, and violin studies at age 7, where she proved more sympathetic to the violin. She became recognized as a child prodigy, and by the age of 9 she was already playing the Mendelssohn Violin Concerto with the Seoul Philharmonic Orchestra. As time progressed she steadily won most of the famous music competitions in Korea. With her siblings, Chung toured around the country, performing music both as soloist and as a part of an ensemble. As the children became famous in Korea, Chung's mother felt that it was too small a country for her children to further their musical careers , and she decided to move to the United States. All of Chung's siblings played classical instruments and three of them would become professional musicians. Her younger brother, Myung-whun Chung is a conductor and a pianist, and her older sister, Myung-wha Chung is a cellist and teacher at the Korean National University of Arts in Seoul. The three of them have subsequently performed professionally in their later careers as the Chung Trio.

At age thirteen, she arrived in the United States. She followed her older flautist sister Myung-Soh Chung in attending the Juilliard School in New York, where she studied with Ivan Galamian.

Musical career 
In 1967, Chung and Pinchas Zukerman were the joint winners of the Edgar Leventritt Competition, the first time for such an outcome in the history of the competition. This prize led to several engagements in North America, such as with the Chicago Symphony Orchestra and the New York Philharmonic. She substituted for Nathan Milstein for his White House Gala when he became indisposed.

Her next big opportunity came in 1970 as a substitute for Itzhak Perlman, with the London Symphony Orchestra.  The success of this engagement led to many other performances in the United Kingdom and a recording contract with Decca/London. Her debut album with André Previn and London Symphony Orchestra, which coupled Tchaikovsky and Sibelius concertos, brought her international attention, including the top recommendation in the BBC Radio 3's Building a Library programme which compared the various recordings of the Sibelius.  In Europe, Chung continued her musical studies with Joseph Szigeti.

Her commercial recordings include core repertoire violin concerti, including Beethoven, Tchaikovsky, and Berg. She has recorded chamber works such as the Brahms violin sonatas, Franck & Debussy sonatas, and Respighi & Strauss sonatas (with Krystian Zimerman, a recording which earned her a Gramophone Award for Best Chamber Recording). Other recordings include Vivaldi's Four Seasons, which was selected as Gramophone's editorial choice, and the Brahms violin concerto with the Vienna Philharmonic under Simon Rattle.

In 1997, she celebrated the 30th anniversary of her international debut at Barbican Centre in London and in her hometown of Seoul, South Korea. In 2008, illness and injury caused her to halt her performing career temporarily. Her most recent return to live performance was in London at the Royal Festival Hall in December 2014. However, her reaction to the audience coughing, including persistent coughing from a child in her line of vision and her subsequent talking to the child's parents, caused widely reported controversy at this recital.

Chung has two sons, Frederick and Eugene, from her past marriage to the British businessman Geoffrey Leggett. Their 1984 marriage ended in divorce.

Educator
In 2007, Chung joined Juilliard as a member of the faculty of the school's Music and Pre-College Divisions. She received the Kyung-Ahm Prize in 2005. In 2011, she received the Ho-Am Prize in the Arts division in recognition of her 40-year-long career as a violinist and educator.

Discography

Solo recordings

Chung trio recordings

See Kyung-Wha Chung discography at discogs.com

References

External links
 Kyung Wha Chung Official Website
[ Kyung Wha Chung] at allmusic
 Kyung-Wha Chung, "I have always welcomed children to my concerts". The Guardian, Music Blog, 9 December 2014
 "The Celebrated Korean Violinist Kyung Wha Chung speaking with Pete Myers", Radio Netherlands Archives, 1982

1948 births
Living people
Juilliard School alumni
Leventritt Award winners
Honorary Members of the Royal Academy of Music
People from Seoul
South Korean violinists
South Korean classical violinists
South Korean emigrants to the United States
Women classical violinists
21st-century classical violinists
21st-century women musicians
Recipients of the Ho-Am Prize in the Arts